The spotjaw moray (Gymnothorax mareei) is a moray eel found in the eastern Atlantic Ocean. It was first named by Max Poll in 1953.

References

mareei
Fish described in 1953